The Wenzil Taylor Building is a historic building located in Spillville, Iowa, United States.  Wenzil Taylor had this building constructed in 1871 for use as a general merchandise store.  It is located in the town's original commercial district, and it is the last remaining  commercial
structure from that era.

The two-story structure has side and rear walls of rubble limestone with a brick facade.  The decorative elements of the Italianate style building features brick arches with dressed limestone keystones, recessed brick panels, and brick pilasters. The bracketed cornice on the top is a recreation added during the building's restoration in the 1980s.

It continued to house a merchandise store for most of its history, and was used as a residence before it was abandoned.  The building was listed on the National Register of Historic Places in 1979. After its restoration in the 1980s, it became a restaurant and inn.

References 

Commercial buildings completed in 1871
Commercial buildings on the National Register of Historic Places in Iowa
National Register of Historic Places in Winneshiek County, Iowa
Buildings and structures in Winneshiek County, Iowa
Italianate architecture in Iowa